The Waldemar Open was a golf tournament on the LPGA Tour from 1963 to 1964. It was played at the Tam O'Shanter Club in Brookville, New York.

Winners
Waldemar Open
1964 Mickey Wright

Carvel Ladies Open
1963 Kathy Whitworth

References

Former LPGA Tour events
Golf in New York (state)
Sports in Long Island
History of women in New York (state)